Brunner Island Steam Electric Station is a coal-fired, alternatively natural gas-powered electrical generation facility in York County, Pennsylvania. It occupies most of the area of the eponymous island on Susquehanna River. The power plant has three major units, which came online in 1961, 1965, and 1969, with respective generating capacities of 334 MW, 390 MW, and 759 MW (in winter conditions). In addition, three internal combustion generators (2.8 MWe each) were installed in 1967. Talen Energy will stop coal use at the plant in 2028.

Environmental impact
PPL, the owner of the plant at the time, announced in 2005 that it would begin to install scrubbers at the plant and that installation would be complete by 2009. The scrubbers, PPL says, are intended to annually remove 100,000 tons of sulfur. The facility was cited as one of several facilities in the region by a USA Today study of air quality around area schools as a potential source of significant pollutants. Fly ash from the Brunner Island facility is approved for use in construction projects, especially for "use in concrete mixes to reduce alkali silica reactivity of aggregate."

Greenhouse gas emissions
In 2021, the facility produced 2.28 megatonnes of CO2 equivalent (tCO2e) greenhouse gas emissions. This is the same climate impact as 491,312 gasoline-powered passenger vehicles driven for one year. With respect to greenhouse gas emissions, out of 89 power stations in the state, Brunner Island ranks as the 13th most polluting.

Sulphur dioxide emissions
In 2006, Brunner Island ranked 27th on the list of most-polluting major power station in the US in terms of sulphur dioxide gas emission rate: it discharged  of SO2 for each MWh of electric power produced that year (93,545 tons of SO2 per year in total). Scrubbers began operation in 2009, removing about 90-percent of sulfur dioxide emissions, and they reduce mercury emissions. They spray a mixture of crushed limestone and water onto the exhaust gas before it goes out the plant's chimney. Sulfur reacts with the limestone and water in the plant's exhaust, forming synthetic gypsum. This is collected and shipped to a drywall manufacturing company.

Waste heat
Brunner Island discharges all of its waste heat (about 1.44 times its electrical output) into its brand new cooling towers as of 2009.

Conversion to Natural Gas
As part of a 2018 out-of-court settlement with the Sierra Club, which had previously sued the plant and its current owner, Talen Energy, over air and water pollution, Brunner Island will eventually completely phase out coal. By 2023, Brunner Island will stop burning coal from May to September, which is considered peak smog season.  By 2028, the facility will have completely switched over to natural gas.

See also

 List of power stations in Pennsylvania

References 

Energy infrastructure completed in 1961
Energy infrastructure completed in 1965
Energy infrastructure completed in 1969
Coal-fired power stations in Pennsylvania
Buildings and structures in York County, Pennsylvania